The following is an alphabetical list of articles related to the U.S. state of Tennessee.

0–9 

.tn.us – Internet second-level domain for the state of Tennessee
16th state to join the United States of America

A
Adjacent states:  (one of only two states with eight neighboring states)

Agriculture in Tennessee
Airports in Tennessee
Alcohol laws in Tennessee
Amusement parks in Tennessee
Appalachia
Aquaria in Tennessee
commons:Category:Aquaria in Tennessee
Arboreta in Tennessee
commons:Category:Arboreta in Tennessee
Archaeology in Tennessee
:Category:Archaeological sites in Tennessee
commons:Category:Archaeological sites in Tennessee
Architecture in Tennessee
Art museums and galleries in Tennessee
commons:Category:Art museums and galleries in Tennessee
Astronomical observatories in Tennessee
commons:Category:Astronomical observatories in Tennessee

B
Botanical gardens in Tennessee
commons:Category:Botanical gardens in Tennessee
Buildings and structures in Tennessee
commons:Category:Buildings and structures in Tennessee

C

Cannabis in Tennessee
Capital of the State of Tennessee
Capital punishment in Tennessee
Capitol of the State of Tennessee
commons:Category:Tennessee State Capitol
Caves of Tennessee
commons:Category:Caves of Tennessee
Census statistical areas of Tennessee
Cities in Tennessee
commons:Category:Cities in Tennessee
Citizens for Home Rule
Climate of Tennessee
Climate change in Tennessee 
Colleges and universities in Tennessee
commons:Category:Universities and colleges in Tennessee
Communications in Tennessee
commons:Category:Communications in Tennessee
Companies in Tennessee
Congressional districts of Tennessee
Constitution of Tennessee
Convention centers in Tennessee
commons:Category:Convention centers in Tennessee
Counties of the state of Tennessee
commons:Category:Counties in Tennessee
Crime in Tennessee
Culture of Tennessee
commons:Category:Tennessee culture

D
Demographics of Tennessee

E
Economy of Tennessee
:Category:Economy of Tennessee
commons:Category:Economy of Tennessee
Education in Tennessee
:Category:Education in Tennessee
commons:Category:Education in Tennessee
Elections in the state of Tennessee
commons:Category:Tennessee elections
Environment of Tennessee
commons:Category:Environment of Tennessee

F

Festivals in Tennessee
commons:Category:Festivals in Tennessee
Flag of Knoxville, Tennessee
Flag of the state of Tennessee
Forts in Tennessee
:Category:Forts in Tennessee
commons:Category:Forts in Tennessee

G

Geography of Tennessee
:Category:Geography of Tennessee
commons:Category:Geography of Tennessee
Geology of Tennessee
:Category:Geology of Tennessee
commons:Category:Geology of Tennessee
Ghost towns in Tennessee
:Category:Ghost towns in Tennessee
commons:Category:Ghost towns in Tennessee
Golf clubs and courses in Tennessee
Government of Tennessee  website
:Category:Government of Tennessee
commons:Category:Government of Tennessee
Governor of Tennessee
List of governors of Tennessee
Seal of Tennessee
Great Smoky Mountains National Park
Gun laws in Tennessee

H
Damon Rivers Headden
Heritage railroads in Tennessee
commons:Category:Heritage railroads in Tennessee
High schools of Tennessee
Higher education in Tennessee
Highway routes in Tennessee
Hiking trails in Tennessee
commons:Category:Hiking trails in Tennessee
History of Tennessee
Historical outline of Tennessee
Hospitals in Tennessee
House of Representatives of the State of Tennessee

I
Images of Tennessee
commons:Category:Tennessee

J

K
Kingston, Tennessee, state capital for one day in 1807
Knoxville, Tennessee, territorial capital 1791–1796, state capital 1796–1807, 1807–1812, and 1817–1818

L
Lakes of Tennessee
commons:Category:Lakes of Tennessee
Landmarks in Tennessee
commons:Category:Landmarks in Tennessee
LGBT rights in Tennessee
Lieutenant Governor of the State of Tennessee
Lists related to the State of Tennessee:
List of airports in Tennessee
List of census statistical areas in Tennessee
List of cities in Tennessee
List of colleges and universities in Tennessee
List of counties in Tennessee
List of forts in Tennessee
List of ghost towns in Tennessee
List of governors of Tennessee
List of high schools in Tennessee
List of highway routes in Tennessee
List of hospitals in Tennessee
List of individuals executed in Tennessee
List of law enforcement agencies in Tennessee
List of lieutenant governors of Tennessee
List of museums in Tennessee
List of National Historic Landmarks in Tennessee
List of newspapers in Tennessee
List of people from Tennessee
List of radio stations in Tennessee
List of railroads in Tennessee
List of Registered Historic Places in Tennessee
List of rivers of Tennessee
List of school districts in Tennessee
List of state forests in Tennessee
List of state highway routes in Tennessee
List of state parks in Tennessee
List of state prisons in Tennessee
List of symbols of the State of Tennessee
List of television stations in Tennessee
List of towns in Tennessee
List of United States congressional delegations from Tennessee
List of United States congressional districts in Tennessee
List of United States representatives from Tennessee
List of United States senators from Tennessee

M
Maps of Tennessee
commons:Category:Maps of Tennessee
Mass media in Tennessee
Memphis, Tennessee
Memphis Zoo
Milan Army Ammunition Plant
Mississippi River
Mountains of Tennessee
commons:Category:Mountains of Tennessee
Murfreesboro, Tennessee, state capital 1818-1826
Museums in Tennessee
:Category:Museums in Tennessee
commons:Category:Museums in Tennessee
Music of Tennessee
commons:Category:Music of Tennessee
:Category:Musical groups from Tennessee
:Category:Musicians from Tennessee

N
Nashville, Tennessee, state capital 1812-1817 and since 1826
National Forests of Tennessee
commons:Category:National Forests of Tennessee
Natural arches of Tennessee
commons:Category:Natural arches of Tennessee
Natural history of Tennessee
commons:Category:Natural history of Tennessee
Nature centers in Tennessee
commons:Category:Nature centers in Tennessee
Newspapers of Tennessee

O
Outdoor sculptures in Tennessee
commons:Category:Outdoor sculptures in Tennessee

P
People from Tennessee
:Category:People from Tennessee
commons:Category:People from Tennessee
:Category:People by city in Tennessee
:Category:People by county in Tennessee
:Category:People from Tennessee by occupation
Politics of Tennessee
commons:Category:Politics of Tennessee
Protected areas of Tennessee
commons:Category:Protected areas of Tennessee

Q

R
Radio stations in Tennessee
Railroad museums in Tennessee
commons:Category:Railroad museums in Tennessee
Railroads in Tennessee
Registered historic places in Tennessee
commons:Category:Registered Historic Places in Tennessee
Religion in Tennessee
:Category:Religion in Tennessee
commons:Category:Religion in Tennessee
Rivers of Tennessee
commons:Category:Rivers of Tennessee
Rocky Mount, capital of the Territory South of the River Ohio 1790-1791
Roller coasters in Tennessee
commons:Category:Roller coasters in Tennessee

S
Same-sex marriage in Tennessee
School districts of Tennessee
Scopes Trial
Scouting in Tennessee
Secretary of the State of Tennessee
Senate of the State of Tennessee
Settlements in Tennessee
Cities in Tennessee
Towns in Tennessee
Census Designated Places in Tennessee
Other unincorporated communities in Tennessee
List of ghost towns in Tennessee
Sports in Tennessee
:Category:Sports in Tennessee
commons:Category:Sports in Tennessee
:Category:Sports venues in Tennessee
commons:Category:Sports venues in Tennessee
State Capitol of Tennessee
State highway routes in Tennessee
State of Tennessee  website
Constitution of the State of Tennessee
Government of the State of Tennessee
:Category:Government of Tennessee
commons:Category:Government of Tennessee
Executive branch of the government of the State of Tennessee
Governor of the State of Tennessee
Legislative branch of the government of the State of Tennessee
Legislature of the State of Tennessee
Senate of the State of Tennessee
House of Representatives of the State of Tennessee
Judicial branch of the government of the State of Tennessee
Supreme Court of the State of Tennessee
State parks of Tennessee
commons:Category:State parks of Tennessee
State prisons of Tennessee
Structures in Tennessee
commons:Category:Buildings and structures in Tennessee
Supreme Court of the State of Tennessee
Symbols of the State of Tennessee
commons:Category:Symbols of Tennessee
Society of Workforce Planning Professionals

T
Telecommunications in Tennessee
commons:Category:Communications in Tennessee
Telephone area codes in Tennessee
Television shows set in Tennessee
Television stations in Tennessee
Tennessee  website
:Category:Tennessee
commons:Category:Tennessee
commons:Category:Maps of Tennessee
Tennessee Barn Dance
Tennessee Heritage Protection Act
Tennessee Hurricanes
Tennessee login law
Tennessee Marriage Protection Amendment
Tennessee Native Plant Society
Tennessee River
Tennessee River 600
Tennessee Soybean Festival
Tennessee State Capitol
Tennessee Student Assistance Corporation
Tennessee Valley Authority
Theatres in Tennessee
commons:Category:Theatres in Tennessee
TN – United States Postal Service postal code for the State of Tennessee
Tourism in Tennessee
commons:Category:Tourism in Tennessee
Towns in Tennessee
commons:Category:Cities in Tennessee
Transportation in Tennessee
:Category:Transportation in Tennessee
commons:Category:Transport in Tennessee

U
United States of America
States of the United States of America
United States census statistical areas of Tennessee
United States congressional delegations from Tennessee
United States congressional districts in Tennessee
United States Court of Appeals for the Sixth Circuit
United States District Court for the Eastern District of Tennessee
United States District Court for the Middle District of Tennessee
United States District Court for the Western District of Tennessee
United States representatives from Tennessee
United States senators from Tennessee
Universities and colleges in Tennessee
commons:Category:Universities and colleges in Tennessee
US-TN – ISO 3166-2:US region code for the State of Tennessee

V

W
Water parks in Tennessee
Waterfalls of Tennessee
commons:Category:Waterfalls of Tennessee
White's Fort, capital of the Territory South of the River Ohio 1791-1796
Wikimedia
Wikimedia Commons:Category:Tennessee
commons:Category:Maps of Tennessee
Wikinews:Category:Tennessee
Wikinews:Portal:Tennessee
Wikipedia Category:Tennessee
Wikipedia Portal:Tennessee
Wikipedia:WikiProject Tennessee
:Category:WikiProject Tennessee articles
:Category:WikiProject Tennessee participants

X

Y

Z
Zoos in Tennessee
commons:Category:Zoos in Tennessee

See also

Topic overview:
Tennessee
Outline of Tennessee

Tennessee
 
Tennessee